The 2001 Southland Conference baseball tournament was held from May 16 to 19, 2001 to determine the champion of the Southland Conference in the sport of college baseball for the 2001 season.  The event pitted the top six finishers from the conference's regular season in a double-elimination tournament held at Vincent–Beck Stadium, home field of Lamar in Beaumont, Texas.  Third-seeded  won their first championship and claimed the automatic bid to the 2001 NCAA Division I baseball tournament.

Seeding and format
The top six finishers from the regular season were seeded one through six.  They played a double-elimination tournament.

Bracket and results

All-Tournament Team
The following players were named to the All-Tournament Team.

Most Valuable Player
K. J. Hendricks was named Tournament Most Valuable Player.  Hendricks was a shortstop for Texas–Arlington.

References

Tournament
Southland Conference Baseball Tournament
Southland Conference baseball tournament
Southland Conference baseball tournament